Daphnella supercostata is a species of sea snail, a marine gastropod mollusk in the family Raphitomidae.

Description
The length of the shell attains 13 mm, its diameter 5½ mm.

The small, whitish golden yellow shell has an ovate-fusiform shape. It contains 6⅓ whorls. The convex whorls are slightly excavated near the suture. The first 1½ whorls are smooth. The upper ones only are longitudinally ribbed (about 10).  And the minute striation forms a very fine reticulation over the entire surface. These are the chief characteristics of this very distinct species. The body whorl is tumid and contracted at the base. The aperture is slightly longer than the spire. The columella stands almost straight. The siphonal canal is short and slightly recurved. The outer lip is markedly sinuated at the suture and incrassate outwards.

Distribution
This marine species occurs off Japan.

References

 Stahlschmidt P., Poppe G.T. & Chino M. (2014) Description of seven new Daphnella species from the Philippines (Gastropoda: Raphitomidae). Visaya 4(2): 29-38.

External links
 
 Gastropods.com: Daphnella (Daphnella) supercostata

supercostata
Gastropods described in 1882